Cité is a metro station on Line 4 of the Paris Métro in the 4th arrondissement of Paris.

Location
Cité station lies underneath the Île de la Cité, one of two islands on the Seine within the historical boundaries of Paris. In relation to the rest of the city, it lies within the 4th arrondissement, near Kilometre Zero, the official geographical and historical centre of Paris. The only station on the Île de la Cité, it lies near many famous landmarks, the most famous being the Cathedral of Notre Dame. To the west are the Sainte-Chapelle chapel and the Palace of Justice, while Notre Dame and the Hôtel-Dieu are to the east.

History
The station was opened on 10 December 1910 on the section of the line under the Seine between Châtelet and Raspail. This section of the line had actually opened on 9 January 1910 but trains passed through the station without stopping until the December of that year. On 16 January it was completely submerged by the 1910 Great Flood of Paris.

It owes its name to its location under Île de la Cité, considered the ancient cradle of the city of Paris, formerly Lutetia. The name Cité refers to the fortified boundaries of Paris as they were at the end of antiquity, on the island, and which was the urban nucleus of the medieval city.

The station is also, with Rome on Line 2, Iéna on Line 9 as well as the Haxo ghost station between the 3 bis and 7 bis lines, one of the four whose name consists of four letters.

Along with the nearby Saint-Michel metro station, it was one of two stopping points equipped in 1911 with an elevator connecting the distribution room to the platforms, the other, the République metro station, which was the first in the network to benefit from it in 1910.

Tunnels were later built linking the station to the nearby Prefecture of Police of Paris and the Palais de Justice which were about 100 metres from the current entrance. These undergrounds were used in particular to escape the Germans during the Second World War. However, for security reasons, these tunnels have now been closed for more than thirty years.

The platforms were modernized after 1988 by the adoption of a particular variation of the Ouï-dire style, in this case green, characterized by globe candelabra lighting. As part of the RATP's Un métro + beau programme, the station corridors were renovated on 20 December 2012.

On 9 October 2019, half of the nameplates on the station's platforms were temporarily replaced by the RATP to celebrate the 60th anniversary of Asterix and Obelix, as in eleven other stations. Taking the characteristic typography of the comic strip of René Goscinny and Albert Uderzo, Cité is humorously renamed "Lutèce", a French-language form of the name used by the Romans to refer to Paris.

In 2019, according to RATP estimates, the station's annual travellers was 1,740,572 passengers, placing it 264th in the number of metro stations out of 302.

Passenger services

Access
The station has a single entrance entitled Place Louis Lépine, leading to the right of building, 2 Place Louis Lépine. Consisting of a fixed staircase, it is decorated with a Guimard edicule, which is the subject of an inscription under the title of historical monuments by the decree of 25 July 1965.

The old exit, still visible, gave direct access to the police prefecture and the courthouse (Palais de Justice) in the Cour du Mai to the right of the monumental gate as one enters.

Access to the platforms is via fixed stairs or elevators.

Station layout

Platforms
Similar to most Paris Métro stations, Cité utilises a side platform setup with two tracks. This makes it possible for the station to handle seven-car trains. However, due to the length of other station platforms and the automation process on Line 4, the train length will be limited to six cars.

Because of the station's depth, passengers must walk down to a mezzanine level, which contains ticket machines and fare control gates, and then another three flights of stairs before reaching the platform level. As the Paris Métro runs inversely to normal railways in the rest of France, the eastern track is used by trains heading northbound to Porte de Clignancourt and the western southbound to Montrouge.

Bus connections
The resort is served by lines 21, 27, 38, 47, 58, 85, 96 and the Paris L'OpenTour tourist line of the RATP Bus Network and at night, by the N12, N13, N14, N15, N21 and N22 lines of the Noctilien network.

Gallery

Reference

Paris Métro stations in the 4th arrondissement of Paris
Railway stations in France opened in 1910
Île de la Cité